Roger Shaler Bagnall (born August 19, 1947 in Seattle) is an American classical scholar. He was a professor of classics and history at Columbia University from 1974 until 2007, when he took up the position of first Director of the Institute for the Study of the Ancient World (ISAW) at New York University.

Born in Seattle, Washington, Bagnall studied at Yale University (B.A., 1968) and University of Toronto (M.A., 1969; Ph.D., 1972). He has published several works on the history of Ancient Greece and Ancient Egypt, as well as papyrology. He was elected a Fellow of the American Academy of Arts and Sciences in 2000 and a member of the American Philosophical Society in 2001.

In 2003, he won the Mellon Distinguished Achievement Award.

References

External links
 ISAW Faculty Biography Page for Roger Bagnall
 Finding aid to the Roger Bagnall papers at Columbia University. Rare Book & Manuscript Library.

Selected works

Books 

 With Raffaella Cribiore (2006) Women's Letters from Ancient Egypt, 300 BC-AD 800. Ann Arbor, MI: University of Michigan Press.

Publications 
 Bagnall, R., Aravecchia N., Cribiore R., Davoli P., McFadden, S., &  Kaper, O. E. (2015) An Oasis City, New York: NYU Press.

1947 births
American classical scholars
Classical scholars of Columbia University
Fellows of the American Academy of Arts and Sciences
Living people
Classical scholars of New York University
Educators from Seattle
American papyrologists
University of Toronto alumni
Yale University alumni
Scholars of ancient Greek history
American expatriates in Canada
Florida State University faculty
Corresponding Fellows of the British Academy

Members of the American Philosophical Society